Marvin Harold (Red) Smith (July 17, 1899 – February 19, 1961) was a shortstop in Major League Baseball who played briefly for the Philadelphia Athletics in the 1925 season. Smith batted left-handed and threw right-handed. He was born in Ashley, Illinois.

In his one-season career, Smith was a .286 hitter (4-for-14) with one run and one RBI without home runs in 20 games played.

Smith died in Los Angeles, at the age of 61.

External links
Baseball Reference
Retrosheet

Major League Baseball shortstops
Philadelphia Athletics players
Baseball players from Illinois
1899 births
1961 deaths